Rajya Sabha elections were held on various dates in 1971, to elect members of the Rajya Sabha, Indian Parliament's upper chamber.

Elections
Elections were held to elect members from various states.

Members elected
The following members are elected in the elections held in 1971. They are members for the term 1971-1977 and retire in year 1977, except in case of the resignation or death before the term.
The list is incomplete.

State - Member - Party

Bye-elections
The following bye elections were held in the year 1971.

State - Member - Party

 Orissa - Biju Patnaik - JD ( ele  13/05/1971 term till 1972 ) res 06/10/1971
 Maharashtra - V. N. Gadgil - INC ( ele  06/05/1971 term till 1976 )
 Bihar - Bideshwari Prasad Singh - INC ( ele  13/05/1971 term till 1974 )
 Bihar - D.P. Singh -  INC ( ele  17/06/1971 term till 1972 )
 Bihar - Sitaram Kesari - INC ( ele  02/07/1971 term till 1974 )
 Tamil Nadu - M Kamalanathan - DMK ( ele  29/07/1971 term till 1972 )
 Maharashtra - Sushila S Adivarekar - INC ( ele  18/09/1971 term till 1972 )
 Uttar Pradesh -  Prof Saiyid Nurul Hasan - INC ( ele  11/11/1971 term till 1972 )
 Nominated -  Dr Vidya Prakash Dutt - NOM ( ele  04/12/1971 term till 1974 )

References

1971 elections in India
1971